Cedar Township is a township in Pocahontas County, Iowa, USA.

History
Cedar Township was established in 1870, soon after the railroad had been built through that territory.

References

Townships in Pocahontas County, Iowa
Townships in Iowa